Charles W. Morgan is an American whaling ship built in 1841 that was active during the 19th and early 20th centuries. Ships of this type were used to harvest the blubber of whales for whale oil which was commonly used in lamps. Charles W. Morgan has served as a museum ship since the 1940s and is now an exhibit at the Mystic Seaport museum in Mystic, Connecticut. She is the world's oldest surviving (non-wrecked) merchant vessel, the only surviving wooden whaling ship from the 19th century American merchant fleet (of an estimated 2,700 built), and second to the USS Constitution, the oldest seaworthy vessel in the world.  The Morgan was designated a National Historic Landmark in 1966.

Construction 

Charles W. Morgan (often referred to simply as "the Morgan") was a whaling ship named for owner Charles Waln Morgan (1796–1861). He was a Philadelphian by birth; he moved to New Bedford, Massachusetts in 1818 and invested in several whalers over his career. He chose Jethro and Zachariah Hillman's shipyard in New Bedford to construct a new ship. The Morgan live oak keel was laid down in February 1841 and fastened together with copper bolts. The bow and stern pieces of live oak were secured to the keel by an apron piece. The sturdy stern post was strengthened with hemlock root and white oak. Yellow pine shipped from North Carolina was used for the ship's beams, and hemlock or hackmatack was used for the hanging knees.

Construction proceeded until April 19, 1841, when the workers went on strike, demanding a ten-hour work day. The strike gathered support until it encompassed the shipyard, the oil refineries, and the cooper shops; Morgan was appointed chairman of the employers and given the task of resolving it. He opposed their demands, and a meeting with four master mechanics ended in failure. An agreement was reached on May 6 when the workers accepted a 10½ hour workday. Work resumed on the ship without incident and she was launched on July 21, 1841. She measured 314 gross register tons.

The Morgan was outfitted at Rotch's Wharf for the next two months while preparations were made for her first voyage. Captain Thomas Norton sailed her into the Atlantic alongside Adeline Gibbs and Nassau towards the Azores. A stop was made at Porto Pim (Horta, Azores) on Faial Island to gather supplies before crossing the Atlantic.  The ship passed Cape Horn, then charted a course to the north. On December 13, the men launched in their whaleboats and took their first whale. The Morgan entered the port of Callao in early February and departed again on the 10th for the Galapagos Islands. In 1844, the ship sailed to the Kodiak Grounds before sailing for home on August 18. She returned to her home port in New Bedford on January 2, 1845. The voyage of three years and three months resulted in 59 whales being processed for 1,600 barrels of sperm oil, 800 barrels of right whale oil, and five tons of whale bone.

Service life 

Charles W. Morgan made most of her 37 voyages in her 80 years of service from her home port of New Bedford, Massachusetts, ranging in length from nine months to five years. She brought home a total of 54,483 barrels of sperm and whale oil and 152,934 pounds of whalebone. She sailed in the Indian and South Atlantic Oceans, surviving ice and snow storms. Her crew survived a cannibal attack in the South Pacific. She was based in San Francisco between 1888 and 1904.

The Morgan had more than 1,000 whalemen of all races and nationalities in her lifetime. Her crew included sailors from Cape Verde, New Zealand, the Seychelles, Guadeloupe, and Norfolk Island.  The ship's crew averaged around 33 men per voyage. As with other whaleships in the 19th century, the Morgan was often home to the captain's family. She was owned and managed by the J. & W. R. Wing Company of New Bedford.

Experts have calculated the lifetime financial returns from the Morgan at over $1.4 Million. Voyage #6 had the highest return with a combined value of Sperm oil, Whale oil and Whalebone of over $165,000.

During her years of service, the Morgan was used in several movies, including Miss Petticoats (1916), Down to the Sea in Ships (1922), and Java Head (1923).

Voyage summary

Preservation 
Charles W. Morgan was nearly destroyed in 1924 when the steamer Sankaty caught fire and broke free of her mooring lines. The burning Sankaty drifted across the river and into Morgans port quarter, but the Fairhaven firemen managed to save her. This event spurred Harry Neyland and some New Bedford citizens to restore and preserve the Morgan, but the attempts were unsuccessful. Neyland then persuaded Colonel Edward Howland Robinson Green to save the ship. Neyland appealed to Green that the Morgan was of historical importance and was a family heirloom because she was once co-owned by Green's grandfather and his wife's company. Green had the ship towed to his estate in Round Hill (Dartmouth, Massachusetts) and founded Whaling Enshrined, consisting of himself, Neyland, and John Bullard, the great-grandson of Charles Waln Morgan.

The Morgan underwent restoration by Captain George Fred Tilton and was turned into an exhibition for Green's estate in a berth constructed by Frank Taylor. Green held a dedication ceremony on the 86th anniversary of the ship's launch and gave her to Whaling Enshrined on July 21, 1926. The ship's fate came into question when Tilton died in 1932 and Green died in 1935, resulting in lengthy court proceedings over Green's estate. The 1938 New England hurricane damaged Morgans hull and tore the sails; Whaling Enshrined attempted to secure funds for the ship but were unable to do so.

In 1941, the Morgan was saved by the Marine Historical Association (later renamed Mystic Seaport) based on Taylor's word that the ship could be freed and towed to Mystic, Connecticut. Taylor's crew dug the ship from her berth and dredged a channel for her to pass through, but the first attempt to pull her free was unsuccessful. More digging and caulking of the ship preceded her successful tugging into the channel, and the century-old hull withstood the move and floated into bay with assistance from the Coast Guard cutter General Greene.

She was towed to the old berth in Fairhaven for several days of preparations and repairs prior to the trip to Mystic.

On November 5, 1941, General Greene pulled Charles W. Morgan from the wharf only to have her be caught by the tide and swept downstream, coming to rest on a mud flat and taking two hours to be freed. The journey came to an end on November 8 when she passed through the Mystic bridge and was moored in the Mystic Seaport. The Seaport took shape around Charles W. Morgan with the restoration of its buildings and historic ships that came to reside alongside the Morgan. "Over it all, the Morgan presided like Old Neptune-the centerpiece, the king seated on a throne of gravel, towering high above the scene."

Restoration

Charles W. Morgan arrived at Mystic Seaport in December 1941, and she was declared a National Historic Landmark and listed on the National Register of Historic Places in 1966. In 1971, Melbourne Brindle of Bridgeport, Connecticut designed four commemorative stamps of historic landmarks including the Morgan.

For the first 30 years at Mystic Seaport, she was surrounded by a bed of sand to prevent her from sinking.  Even so, she was open to the public and was the centerpiece of a recreated 19th century maritime village museum inspired by Colonial Williamsburg.  She is the only preserved 19th century whaling ship in the world.

The Mystic Seaport undertook a restoration and preservation project in 1968 to make her seaworthy, and the sand bed was removed.  Prior to the 1968 restoration, she had a wide white stripe painted on her sides with large black squares that resembled gun ports when viewed at a distance.  This "camouflage" was often employed by 19th century merchant ships to make them resemble warships so as to deter pirates and hostile navies.

In 2010, Mystic Seaport engaged in a multimillion-dollar project to restore the ship to seaworthy status. She was re-launched into the Mystic River on July 21, 2013, marking the 172nd anniversary of the vessel's initial launch. During the summer of 2014, she sailed her 38th voyage on tour of New England seaports which included New London, Connecticut, Newport, Rhode Island, Boston, and her home town of New Bedford, Massachusetts.

See also

 List of National Historic Landmarks in Connecticut
 National Register of Historic Places listings in New London County, Connecticut
 List of museum ships

Other preserved 19th-century sailing ships:
 USS Constitution
 USS Niagara
 USS Constellation
 Cutty Sark
 Effie M. Morrissey / Ernestina
 Coronet

References

External links
 Deck prisms on the Charles W. Morgan
 

Whaling ships
Museum ships in Mystic, Connecticut
Tall ships of the United States
Ships built in New Bedford, Massachusetts
National Register of Historic Places in New London County, Connecticut
Historic district contributing properties in Connecticut
Ships on the National Register of Historic Places in Connecticut